Pu Wei (born 20 August 1980) is Chinese former footballer who played as a midfielder. A veteran of three FIFA Women's World Cup tournaments and three Olympics, Pu Wei competed in USA 1999, USA 2003, China 2007,  Sydney 2000 Olympics, Athens 2004 Olympics, and Beijing 2008; as China did not qualify for Germany 2011 World Cup and London 2012 Olympics. Until 2013, Pu was the captain of China women's national football team. She retired after a friendly with North Korea on 15 February 2014.

Olympics and World Cup
Pu Wei finished fifth with the Chinese team at Sydney 2000 Olympics, playing all three matches. Four years later she finished ninth with the Chinese team at Atlanta 2004 Olympics, playing two matches. At Beijing 2008 Olympics, USA 2003 and China 2007 World Cup tournaments, she reached the quarter-finals with her Chinese team. Her best performance, as a member of China women's national team, is reaching the final of USA 1999 women's world cup, losing in penalty-shoot-out.

Pu had a total of 219 caps for China, one of the most capped players in Chinese history. She was given a retirement ceremony by the Chinese Football Association, the first such honour given to a football player. She was awarded a ceremonial jersey numbered "219", signalling the number of appearances she had as a member of the national football team.

International goals

References

External links

1980 births
Living people
Chinese women's footballers
China women's international footballers
Footballers at the 2000 Summer Olympics
Footballers at the 2004 Summer Olympics
Footballers at the 2008 Summer Olympics
Olympic footballers of China
1999 FIFA Women's World Cup players
2003 FIFA Women's World Cup players
2007 FIFA Women's World Cup players
Footballers from Hebei
Washington Freedom players
Asian Games medalists in football
Footballers at the 2002 Asian Games
Footballers at the 2006 Asian Games
Asian Games silver medalists for China
Asian Games bronze medalists for China
Women's association football midfielders
Medalists at the 2002 Asian Games
Medalists at the 2006 Asian Games
FIFA Century Club
Women's United Soccer Association players